The Dudek Shark is a Polish single-place paraglider that was designed and produced by Dudek Paragliding of Bydgoszcz. It is now out of production.

Design and development
The Shark was designed as an intermediate glider and made from Skytex material with Technora lines. The models are each named for their approximate wing area in square metres.

Operational history
Reviewer Noel Bertrand described the Shark in a 2003 review as "technically very elaborate".

Variants
Shark 25
Small-sized model for lightweight pilots.
Shark 27
Mid-sized model for medium weight pilots.
Shark 29
Large-sized model for heavier pilots.

Specifications (Shark 27)

References

External links

Shark
Paragliders